Real Men is a 1987 American comedy film starring James Belushi and John Ritter as the heroes: suave, womanizing CIA agent Nick Pirandello (Belushi) and weak and ineffectual insurance agent Bob Wilson (Ritter).

Plot
After scientists accidentally spill a deadly chemical into the ocean that will eventually kill all life on earth, a group of aliens offer to help humanity. They offer a choice: the 'Good Package' to clean up the mess, or the 'Big Gun', a weapon capable of destroying the planet. The aliens only ask for a glass of water in return, which must be delivered by CIA agent Pillbox, the only human they entirely trust.

While on a run-thru of the alien meetup, agent Pillbox is shot and killed in a forest by an unseen assassin in an inside-job. FBI computers find Bob Wilson, an insurance agent who looks just like Pillbox, and suggest sending Wilson in Pillbox's place. However, Wilson is a meek office worker who we initially see being easily pushed around by a group of local bullies and by a milkman who is trying to seduce his wife.

Tough guy government agent Nick Pirandello is sent to recruit Wilson and escort him to the meeting; he is also to build-up Wilson's confidence and decrease his insecurities. He meets Wilson at Wilson's home, with Russian agents close on his tail, who want a unique map to the meeting place. Wilson thinks Pirandello is an intruder and tries ineffectively to attack him, culminating in a shoot-out with the Russians that devastates Wilson's house.

Pirandello explains the mission as the pair head to meet the aliens near Washington, D.C. Wilson doesn't believe the story, and instead believes that Pirandello is insane. He repeatedly tries to escape, forcing Pirandello to stop and try to convince him they're real. After a series of rather unconvincing demonstrations, one finally convinces Wilson of their authenticity.

Wilson is then willing to do the job, but lacks skills and confidence. The pair meet corrupt CIA agents dressed as clowns, part of a splinter group that would rather receive the Big Gun. Pirandello tells Wilson that he is in fact a Russian sleeper "Super Agent", at which point Wilson charges into battle and is knocked out with one punch. Pirandello defeats the clowns, but leads the waking/groggy Wilson to believe he did it. Wilson gains a new macho attitude.

Pirandello, weakened by love for a dominatrix he meets in a bar in Pittsburgh, abandons the mission, leaving Wilson on his own. During a final shootout between the rogue CIA element and Wilson, Pirandello comes to his senses and rejoins the mission; together they defeat the others, including Pirandello's boss. Wilson meets with the aliens and receives the Good Package to save humanity.

Wilson returns to his home, which has been repaired. With his new-found machismo, he deals with the bullies and the amorous milkman, bringing the film to an end.

Cast

Production
According to DVD Verdict, Real Men was barely released theatrically. The distributor, United Artists, was still suffering the aftereffects of the Heaven's Gate (1980) fiasco and financial troubles were still in full force.

Reception
Upon release, the film received mediocre to poor reviews. In particular, the plot was panned as not credible.

Years later, The A.V. Club retrospectively described the film as one of the most underrated comedies of the 1980s.

References

External links
 
 
 
 
 

1987 films
1980s action comedy films
1980s science fiction comedy films
1980s buddy comedy films
American action comedy films
American buddy comedy films
American science fiction comedy films
American spy comedy films
1980s spy comedy films
United Artists films
Films about extraterrestrial life
Films about the Central Intelligence Agency
Films about the Federal Bureau of Investigation
1987 comedy films
Films produced by Martin Bregman
Films scored by Miles Goodman
1980s English-language films
1980s American films